Vestre Cemetery (meaning "Western Cemetery") is located in a large park setting in the Kongens Enghave district of Copenhagen, Denmark. With its 54 hectares it is the largest cemetery in Denmark.

The cemetery is landscaped and serves as an important open space,
in which people take a stroll, and look at the old graves and monuments.

It is located southwest of the city center, between the Enghave, Sydhavn, Sjælør and Valby train stations on Copenhagen's S-train system, and right next to the historic Carlsberg neighbourhood.

The cemetery is one of five run by Copenhagen municipality.  The other cemeteries are Assistens Cemetery, Brønshøj Cemetery, Sundby Cemetery, and Bispebjerg Cemetery.

The cemetery has a Catholic section, and next to that is a Jewish cemetery (the Jewish Western Cemetery).

History

Vestre Kirkegård was opened on 2 November 1870 to accommodate an urgent need for adequate burial places for the growing population of Copenhagen. Assistens Cemetery, till then the main cemetery of the city, had long been unable to cope with the increasing number of burials.

Hans Jørgen Holm, who was the resident architect for the Copenhagen Burial Services, in collaboration with landscape architect Edvard Glæsel (1858–1915) and city engineer Charles Ambt were responsible for the overall planning and landscaping of the new cemetery. First a burial place for the poor, Vestre Kirkegaard became the principal burial place of Copenhagen during the 1990s.

The setting
The cemetery is noted for its scenery, offers a maze of dense groves, open lawns, winding paths, hedges, overgrown tombs, monuments, tree-lined avenues, ponds and other garden features. Many graves have distinctive gravestones, sculptures or large mausoleums and are eclectically placed. The cemetery's grounds have a variety of trees with many rare species and is a haven to birds and small mammals.

Buildings

Almost all the buildings in the grounds have been designed by Hans Jørgen Holm or Holger Jacobsen who succeeded him as resident architect for the Copenhagen Burial Services.

Holm designed both the North Chapel and South Chapel (1906) as well as an office building the gate at the main entrance. It is unclear who were responsible for the design of the former inspector's house just inside the main entrance.

The East Chapel was inaugurated in 1914 to a design by Holger Jacobsen but only remained in use until 1926.

The Crossroads Project

The Crossroads Project (Danish: Stjernevejsprojektet), designed by Schønher Landskab, is a landscape project centred on the remains of the West Chapel, now serving as a pavilion for contemplation. It was created in 2003 after Copenhagen Municipality arranged a competition for the regeneration of an area characterized by the abandoned South Chapel of the cemetery and elm trees dead from Dutch elm disease. The complex is intended to serve a dual purpose both relating to the location's function as a burial place and as an open space and meeting place in the city, for those seeking peace and silence.

The complex consists of two intersecting axes with the former Southern Chapel in its centre. The chapel was partly demolished, leaving only the central part as an open pavilion-like domed structure. The building is partly overgrown by ivy. The surrounding garden spaces of the two axes, creating a Greek cross, are confined by tall yew hedges and have a grass surface. Embedded in the lawns of the cross arms are narrow,  rust coloured paths made of oxidized iron plates, flanked by rows by cherry trees. At the end of each cross arm is a 9 metre tall rust coloured iron arch.

The design of the project is inspired by Bramante's Tempietto in Rome and the Baroque gardens of Villa Gori in Siena. The latter is characterized by the garden being contained in the two axes of the garden, instead of the axes being the connecting feature of the surrounding gardens as is normally the case.

Monuments and artworks

Just inside the main entrance is Arne Bang's bronze statue En Falden ("A Fallen), which was installed in 1942 to commemorate the Danish soldiers that were killed when Denmark was occupied by Nazi Germany on 9 April 1940. In the North Chapel's courtyard garden are two reliefs by the artist Henrik Starcke, Death and Resurrection, which were installed in 1949. They were a gift from the Albertina Foundation.

Nineteen British former prisoners of war released at the end of World War I, homeward bound, died at Copenhagen around New Year 1919. Among them were a Canadian, an Indian and an Australian from Tasmania. Each has a Commonwealth War Graves Commission headstone and a fine memorial, given by the Danes, was unveiled in their honour in 1920. There are also buried three British casualties from World War II.

In the Faroese section is a monument created by the painter Elof Risebye. The monument in the Greenlandic section 19 is from 1963 and was designed by the sculptor Jan Buhl.

Interments

Among the notables interred at the cemetery are political and business leaders, philosophers, artists, and musicians:
 Carl Aller  (1845–1926), publisher, founder of Aller Media
 Laura Aller (1849–1917), pioneering editor and magazine publisher
 Hans Niels Andersen (1852–1937), businessman, founder of East Asiatic Company
 Herman Bang (1857–1912), writer
 Vilhelm Buhl (1881–1954), political leader, Social Democrat Prime Minister of Denmark
 Anne Marie Carl-Nielsen (1863–1945), sculptor
 Emmy Drachmann (1854–1928),  novelist
 Edvard Eriksen (1876–1959), sculptor, most famous for the statue of the Little Mermaid
 Jørgen Pedersen Gram (1850–1916), mathematician
 Gustav Adolph Hagemann (1842–1916), engineer and businessman
 Vilhelm Hammershøi (1864–1916), painter
 Hanna Hoffmann (1858–1917), sculptor and silversmith
 Karen Hannover (1872–1943), ceramist
 Hans Christian Hansen (1906–1960), political leader, Social Democrat Prime Minister
 Hans Hedtoft (1903–1955), political leader, Social Democrat
 Per Hækkerup (1915–1979), political leader, Social Democrat
 Arthur Jensen (1897–1981), actor 
 August Jerndorff (1846–1906), painter
 Thad Jones (1923–1986), American jazz trumpeter
 Viggo Kampmann (1910–1975), political leader, Social Democrat Prime Minister
 Julie Marstrand (1882–1943), sculptor
 Asta Nielsen (1881–1972), film actress
 Dagmar Olrik (1860–1932), artist
 Carl Nielsen (1865–1931), composer
 Jens Otto Krag (1914–1978), political leader, Social Democrat Prime Minister
 Julius Petersen (1839–1910), mathematician
 Julie Ramsing (1871–1954), philanthropist
 Knud Rasmussen (1879–1933), polar explorer and anthropologist
 Carl Rohl-Smith (1848–1900), Danish-American sculptor
 Thorvald Stauning (1873–1942), political leader, first Social Democrat Prime Minister
 Hermann Baagøe Storck (1839–1922), architect and heraldic artist
 Hjalmar Söderberg (1869–1941), Swedish author
 Ed Thigpen (1930–2010), American jazz drummer
 Laurits Tuxen (1853–1927), sculptor, painter
 Clara Wæver (1855–1930), embroiderer
 Liva Weel (1897–1952), singer, actress
 Carlo  Wieth (1885–1943), actor
 Kristian Zahrtmann (1843–1917), painter

Cultural references
In Nordisk Foraar (1911, "Nordic Spring"), Johannes V. Jensen refers to Vestre Kirkegård as the fairest park in Copenhagen, "taller, more elegant than the city centre" (”Jeg gaar ud på Vestre Kirkegaard en Formiddag og finder mig til Rette./ Det er den smukkeste Park vi har, her er højere end inde i Byen, friere,/ og de unge Træer staar i Luftningen ude fra Søen og gror, svulmer af Frodighed”).

See also
 Parks and open spaces in Copenhagen

References

External links

 Pamphlet with map of the cemetery
 British Commonwealth War Graves at Vestre Cemetery
 CWGC: Copenhagen western cemetery
 Source

Cemeteries in Copenhagen
Lutheran cemeteries
Parks in Copenhagen
Tourist attractions in Copenhagen
Kongens Enghave
1870 establishments in Denmark
Commonwealth War Graves Commission cemeteries in Denmark
Cemeteries established in the 1870s